M/V Agamemnon was a Dutch general cargo vessel built by William Hamilton and Company of Port Glasgow, Scotland. She was launched on 11 December 1946, and completed in June 1947. She was renamed Sincere in 1966. The ship caught fire and foundered on 29 June 1969 off Bunguran Island, Indonesia.

References

1946 ships
Ships built on the River Clyde
Cargo ships of the Netherlands
Shipwrecks in the Natuna Sea
Maritime incidents in 1969